Antaxius is a genus of bush crickets in the tribe Platycleidini found in Europe.

Species
The Orthoptera Species file lists:
subgenus Antaxius Brunner von Wattenwyl, 1882
 Antaxius armillata (Serville, 1838) 
 Antaxius pauliani Chopard, 1939
 Antaxius tavaresi Aires & Menano, 1922
subgenus Chopardius Harz, 1969
 Antaxius beieri Harz, 1966 
 Antaxius chopardi Morales Agacino, 1936 
 Antaxius florezi Bolivar, 1900 
 Antaxius hispanicus Bolívar, 1887 
 Antaxius kraussi (Bolivar, 1878) 
 Antaxius pedestris (Fabricius, 1787)
 Antaxius sorrezensis (Marquet, 1877) 
 Antaxius spinibrachius (Fischer, 1853) 
subgenus Cyrnantaxius Chopard, 1951
 Antaxius bouvieri Chopard, 1923 
subgenus Hoelzeliana Harz, 1962
 Antaxius difformis (Brunner von Wattenwyl, 1861) - type species (as Pterolepis brunneri Krauss, by subsequent designation)

References 

Tettigoniidae genera
Orthoptera of Europe